AirTrain is the name of several passenger railway operations connecting airports to existing rapid transport systems and city centres:

Airtrain Citylink, a railway infrastructure company in Brisbane, Australia
Airport railway line, Brisbane, Australia
AirTrain (San Francisco International Airport), serving San Francisco, California
Operated by the Port Authority of New York and New Jersey:
AirTrain JFK, serving New York City's John F. Kennedy International Airport
AirTrain Newark, serving Newark Liberty International Airport in New Jersey
AirTrain LaGuardia, a proposed service to  New York City's LaGuardia Airport